The Kawasaki Super Sherpa (KL250G USA, KL250H in Japan, Canada, Australia, Greece and the United Kingdom) is a dual-sport motorcycle produced by Kawasaki. It has a 249 cc DOHC four-valve air/oil cooled four-stroke single-cylinder engine.

It was first offered in Japan in 1997 to present, and was sold in the United States from 1999 to 2003. Production and sales continued in Japan and other markets and Kawasaki recently decided to sell the Super Sherpa again in the United States once more for 2009.  The new model remains mostly unchanged from the previous model.

References

Super Sherpa
Dual-sport motorcycles
Motorcycles introduced in 1997